The 2020–21 Southern Miss Golden Eagles basketball team represented the University of Southern Mississippi during the 2020–21 NCAA Division I men's basketball season. The team was led by second-year head coach Jay Ladner, and played their home games at Reed Green Coliseum in Hattiesburg, Mississippi as members of Conference USA.

Roster

Schedule and results

|-
!colspan=12 style=|Non-conference regular season

|-
!colspan=12 style=|CUSA regular season

|-
!colspan=12 style=| Conference USA tournament

|-

See also
 2020–21 Southern Miss Lady Eagles basketball team

Notes

References

Southern Miss Golden Eagles basketball seasons
Southern Miss
Southern Miss basketball
Southern Miss basketball